The press is a significant force in the Yemeni political arena. This is a list of newspapers in Yemen.

See also

Media of Yemen

References

External links
 

Yemen
Newspapers